Seeni sambol, also known as Sini sambol or Sawi sambol, is a traditional Sri Lankan condiment. It is a caramelised onion chutney or relish, with flavours which are spicy, sweet and aromatic. It is served as an accompaniment to rice, curries, idiyappam (string hoppers) and appam (egg hoppers). It is an integral component of lamprais and seeni banis (a brioche bun with seeni sambol filling).

In Sinhala 'seeni' means sweet or sugar and 'sambol' means sauce. The main ingredients are onion, sugar, tamarind juice, red chillies and salt, which can also be combined with maldive fish, curry leaves, lemongrass, cinnamon, cardamom and cloves.

Preparation
The traditional method for making seeni sambol is to sauté thinly sliced onions, curry leaves, lemongrass and spices (cardamom, cinnamon, cloves) in hot vegetable oil until they start to caramelise. Add tamarind juice, maldive fish, sugar and red chillies to the pan and continue to sauté until the moisture evaporates and the onion is a dark golden brown. Add salt to taste and then remove lemongrass and cinnamon stick, allow the sambol to cool completely before sealing in an airtight container.

See also 
 Cuisine of Sri Lanka
 Sambal
 Pol sambol
 Lunumiris

References 

Sri Lankan condiments
Herb and spice mixtures
Onion-based foods